Michael Eric Forsyth (born 20 March 1966) is an English former footballer.

Playing career
Forsyth started his playing career at West Brom after joining as an apprentice at 17, making his debut against Arsenal at Highbury, marking Tony Woodcock and Charlie Nicholas. West Bromwich Albion F.C. won 1 nil. He then moved to Derby County in 1986 for £25,000 where he spent most of his career. Including a spell that saw him win the Jack Stamps Trophy in the 1987–88 season. Subsequent moves to Notts County for £200,000, (including a loan spell at Hereford), Wycombe Wanderers and Burton Albion saw him play out his career.
He joined the Derby County Academy training staff under the management of Nigel Cloughin April 2009.  Since then he has worked as a scout for Nigel Clough at Sheffield United and is currently at Mansfield Town

Honours
Individual
Derby County Player of the Year winner:  1988

References

1966 births
Living people
English footballers
Association football defenders
English Football League players
West Bromwich Albion F.C. players
Derby County F.C. players
Notts County F.C. players
Hereford United F.C. players
Wycombe Wanderers F.C. players
Burton Albion F.C. players
Footballers from Liverpool
Derby County F.C. non-playing staff